The JŽ 664 locomotives were a class of diesel locomotives operated by Yugoslav Railways. They are an GM-EMD export model of type EMD G26, subclass 664-0 was built by EMD, subclass 664-1 was built by Đuro Đaković from 1972 until 1984.

After the breakup of Yugoslavia the locomotives were split. The 664-0 subclass were split between Croatia as HŽ series 2062 (60 units), and Serbia (5 units); the 664-1 subclass were transferred to the Slovenian Railways (as SŽ series 664), 20 units.

See also
Krajina Express, armoured train of Krajina Serbs utilised locomotive number JŽ 664 013 (now HŽ 2062 055) during the Croatian War of Independence.

References

Diesel-electric locomotives of Yugoslavia
Đuro Đaković (company)
Electro-Motive Division locomotives
Standard gauge locomotives of Serbia
Standard gauge locomotives of Yugoslavia
Diesel-electric locomotives of Serbia